is a Japanese football player for Oita Trinita.

Career
After graduating at Juntendo University and even entering the squad for the Universiade, Saka joined Shonan Bellmare and then debuted against Sagan Tosu in J. League Cup.

Club statistics
Updated to 1 August 2022.

References

External links

Profile at J. League
Profile at Shonan Bellmare

1995 births
Living people
Juntendo University alumni
Association football people from Mie Prefecture
Japanese footballers
J1 League players
Shonan Bellmare players
Oita Trinita players
Association football defenders